We're in This Together may refer to:

Songs
"We're in This Together" (Nine Inch Nails song)
"We're in This Together" (Simply Red song)
"We're in This Together", song by Robin S. from her album From Now On
"We're in This Together", song by Catriona Gray
"We're in This Together", song by Justin Bieber from his EP Freedom

Albums
We're in This Together (album) by Low Profile